This is a list of Honorary Fellows of King's College, Cambridge.

 Danielle Allen
 Neal Ascherson
 John Barrell
 Sir George Benjamin
 Sir Adrian Cadbury
 Anthony Clarke, Baron Clarke of Stone-cum-Ebony
 Michael Cook
 Caroline Elam
 John Ellis
 E. M. Forster
 Sir John Eliot Gardiner
 Dame Anne Glover
 Sir Nicholas Goodison
 John Habgood, Baron Habgood
 Oliver Hart
 Hermann Hauser
 Eric Hobsbawm
 Lisa Jardine
 Mervyn King, Baron King of Lothbury
 Sir Geoffrey Lloyd
 Sir Alfred Comyn Lyall
 Prasanta Chandra Mahalanobis
 Dusa McDuff
 Frances Morris
 Karl Pearson
 Nicholas Phillips, Baron Phillips of Worth Matravers
 Sir Edward Playfair
 Atta ur Rahman
 C. R. Rao
 Martin Rees, Baron Rees of Ludlow
 David Sainsbury, Baron Sainsbury of Turville
 Alic Halford Smith
 Robert Tear
 Leslie Valiant
 Herman Waldmann
 Judith Weir
 Sir David Willcocks

See also
 :Category:Alumni of King's College, Cambridge
 :Category:Fellows of King's College, Cambridge

King's College, Cambridge
Honorary
King's College